Dustin Sergio Flores (born February 22, 1985) is an American former soccer player of Bolivian descent. He played as either a striker or a winger.

Flores has represented the United States at U18 and U20 levels. He has been on the roster of Real Salt Lake, The Strongest of Bolivia and Chacarita Juniors of Argentina. He signed for Crystal Palace Baltimore in 2007. In five pre-season games for Crystal Palace Baltimore in their first ever season, Flores scored eight goals.

He retired from professional soccer at the age of 23, and currently lives in Maryland.

Career statistics
(correct as 27 September 2008)

References

1985 births
Living people
USL Second Division players
Crystal Palace Baltimore players
American soccer players
American people of Bolivian descent
Real Salt Lake players
United States men's youth international soccer players
United States men's under-20 international soccer players
Association football midfielders
People from Smithfield, Utah